APRO can stand for:

 ICFTU Asia and Pacific Regional Organisation, former trade union federation
 Aerial Phenomena Research Organization, former UFO research network

See also
 Apro language